The Heart of Midlothian is a mosaic located outside St Giles' Cathedral in Edinburgh. The heart marks the location of the entrance to Edinburgh's Old Tolbooth which was demolished in 1817. Locals will often spit upon the heart as a sign of good luck. While the tradition is now one of good luck, it was originally believed to be done as a sign of disdain for the executions which took place within the Old Tolbooth. 

The Edinburgh football team Heart of Midlothian F.C. takes its name from the Old Tolbooth, and the mosaic which marks its former location.

References

External links
 A short documentary with both locals and tourists giving their differing views about the origin of spitting on The Heart.
 Picture of the Tolbooth in Edinburgh City Libraries' Capital Collections

execution sites in Scotland
history of Edinburgh
mosaics
Royal Mile
Scottish traditions
tourist attractions in Edinburgh